Henri Daco (11 January 1864, in Liège – 7 October 1932 in Liège) was a Belgian painter and neoclassical,

impressionist artist.

Early life and education 
When Henri Daco was a child, he became interested in graphic arts and showed a desire to follow an artistic training. In September 1876, he enrolled at the Academy of Fine Arts, where he completed his secondary and higher education.

Personal life 
In 1913, Daco married Eva Radermacker. They live in apartment located in an empire style mansion, Coronmeuse square in Herstal. In 1935, his widow bequeathed an important part of his works to the municipality of Herstal.

Chronology 
Henri Daco was a painter of landscapes and portraits. The Meuse, with the island Monsin, inspires a whole series of paintings. He painted the quays, the basin, the channel, the canal, the shooting garden. Besides their artistic value, its landscapes are unique documents on corners that have disappeared. His style is strongly marked by his neo-classical formation and is influenced by the romanticism and impressionism of the French fashionable painters. It expresses with accuracy and sensitivity what it sees and feels. Colorist of talent, he loves nature and knows how to understand it and express it.

Works

Oil painting 
Paysage Champêtre
Panorama de la vieille Meuse
Paysage
Nature morte chrysanthèmes
La Laye à l'île Monsin
Statue Charlemagne Bd d'Avroy
Panorama de la vieille Meuse
Rue Haute Sauvenière
L'homme à la pipe, 1892
Jeune mère, 1892
Autoportrait, 1894
La couturière
Femme avec chapeau et parapluie
La liseuse
Paysage de campagne, 1890
Port à Coronmeuse, 1898
Usines en bord de Meuse, 1900
Portrait de femme, 1903
Portrait d'E. Scauflaire à 11 ans, 1904
Paysan à la fourche, 1907
Femme avec enfant dans un champ, 1908
Madame Eva Rademecker, 1912
Portrait de Rose Rousseau avec une rose, 1920
Portrait d'Henriette Rousseaue, 1922
Portrait, 1924
Le boulevard de la Sauvenière, 1930
Les terrasses de Liège, 1932

Watercolor painting 
Bateaux ammarés près du rivage, 1892
Bateau sur la rive, 1892
Bord d'étang, 1892

Pencil drawing 
Tête de profil
Statue de femme et buste
Proportion de l'homme et de la femme
Homme couché bras en croix
Homme nu debout
Homme de profil tenant une lance
Femme nue de dos
Autoportrait, 1904
Château de Micheroux, 1908

Pastel 
Portrait de jeune fille, 1917

References 
 Cf. And. COLLART-SACRE, La libre Seigneurie de Herstal, Lg, Thone, 1930, t. second (addenda)".
 Eug. DE SEYN, Dictionnaire biographique des sciences, lettres et des arts en Belgique.  Tome 1, Éditions l'Avenir, 1935
 Dictionnaire biographique illustré des artistes en Belgique depuis 1830, Éditions Arto, 1995
 Le dictionnaire des peintres belges du XIVe siècle à nos jours, Éditions Renaissance du livre, 1995

Belgian painters
Neoclassical artists
Impressionist artists
Artists from Liège
1864 births
1932 deaths
Herstal